Deborah Jinza Thayer is an American choreographer, dancer, and artistic director, located in Saint Paul, Minnesota.

Early life
Deborah Jinza Thayer was raised in Brooklyn, New York. She received her Bachelor of Arts degree from Johns Hopkins University and received her Master of Fine Arts degree in Dance from George Mason University.

References

American choreographers
American female dancers
American dancers
Johns Hopkins University alumni
Living people
Modern dancers
People from Brooklyn
Year of birth missing (living people)
Dancers from New York (state)
21st-century American women